Daniel Jobin (born 1949) is a Canadian cinematographer from Quebec. He is a two-time Genie Award nominee for Best Cinematography, receiving nods at the 12th Genie Awards in 1991 for Cargo and at the 17th Genie Awards in 1996 for Lilies, and a four-time Jutra/Iris Award nominee for Best Cinematography, receiving nominations at the 11th Jutra Awards in 2009 for Mommy Is at the Hairdresser's (Maman est chez le coiffeur), at the 12th Jutra Awards in 2010 for Je me souviens, at the 14th Jutra Awards in 2012 for Coteau rouge, and at the 18th Quebec Cinema Awards in 2016 for The Passion of Augustine (La Passion d'Augustine).

Filmography
A Woman in Transit (La Femme de l'hôtel) - 1984
The Choice of a People (La Choix d'un peuple) - 1985
Marie in the City (Marie s'en va-t-en ville) - 1987
Cargo - 1990
Louis 19, King of the Airwaves (Louis 19, le roi des ondes) - 1994
Lilies - 1996
The Hanging Garden - 1997
It's Your Turn, Laura Cadieux (C't'à ton tour, Laura Cadieux) - 1998
Laura Cadieux II (Laura Cadieux...la suite) - 1999
Island of the Dead - 2000
Wedding Night (Nuit de noces) - 2001
The Collector (Le Collectionneur) - 2002
The United States of Albert (Les États-Unis d'Albert) - 2005
Mommy Is at the Hairdresser's (Maman est chez le coiffeur) - 2008
Je me souviens - 2009
The Child Prodigy (L'Enfant prodige) - 2010
Stay with Me (Reste avec moi) - 2010
Coteau rouge - 2011
Pink Ribbons, Inc. - 2011
Love Project - 2014
The Passion of Augustine (La Passion d'Augustine) - 2015
Kiss Me Like a Lover (Embrasse-moi comme tu m'aimes) - 2016

References

External links

1949 births
Living people
Canadian cinematographers
French Quebecers